The 1973 Phillip Island 500K was an endurance race for Group C Touring Cars, staged at the Phillip Island circuit in Victoria, Australia on 25 November 1973. Race distance was 106 laps of the 4.73 km circuit, a total distance of 501.38 km. The race, which was the fifth and final round of the 1973 Australian Manufacturers' Championship, was the third Phillip Island 500K.

The race was won by Peter Brock, driving a Holden LJ Torana GTR XU-1 for the Holden Dealer Team.

Classes
Cars competed in four engine capacity classes.
 Class A: Up to 1300cc
 Class B: 1301 – 2000cc
 Class C: 2001 – 3000cc
 Class D: Over 3000cc

Results

Notes
 Entries in Official Souvenir Programme: 47
 Entries on Starting Position Grid Sheet: 39
 Pole Position: Allan Moffat (Ford Falcon GT), 1m 59.8

References

Further reading
 Toranas fill first five places, The Age, Monday, 26 November 1973, page 24

Phillip Island 500
Motorsport at Phillip Island
Phillip Island 500K
November 1973 sports events in Australia